For the 2016 OFC Nations Cup, the 8 participating national teams had to submit squads of 23 players – of which three had to be goalkeepers.

The age listed for each player is on 28 May 2016, the first day of the tournament. The number of caps listed for each player does not include any matches played after the start of the 2016 OFC Nations Cup. The club listed is the club for which the player last played a competitive match prior to the tournament.

Group A

Tahiti
Coach:  Ludovic Graugnard

New Caledonia
Coach:  Thierry Sardo

Samoa
Coach:  Scott Easthope

Papua New Guinea
Coach:  Flemming Serritslev

Group B

Fiji
Coach:  Frank Farina

New Zealand
Coach:  Anthony Hudson

The final squad was announced on 12 May 2016. On 22 May, midfielder Clayton Lewis was replaced by striker Jeremy Brockie, following a possible drugs violation.
On 24 May, forward Shane Smeltz was replaced by midfielder Luka Prelevic following an injury.

Vanuatu
Coach: Moise Poida

Solomon Islands
Coach: Moses Toata

Player representation

By club nationality
Nations in italics are not represented by their national teams in the finals

References

squads
OFC Nations Cup squads